Pseudopeziza medicaginis, is a fungal pathogen of alfalfa.

External links 
 Index Fungorum
 USDA ARS Fungal Database

Host and Symptoms  
Common leaf spot on alfalfa is a foliar disease caused by the pathogen Pseudopeziza medicaginis. P. medicaginis is an ascomycete and can also cause leaf spot in crops like red clover. Although not much research has been done on this specific disease, it has been reported as the most common alfalfa disease and it causes the greatest yield loss in alfalfa crops for over 100 years (Jones, 1919). It has been shown in multiple studies that it can cause up to 40% loss in yield but average losses are closer to 18% (Nutter et al., 2002). The first symptoms of leaf spot are small circular lesions that form on the lowest leaves on the plant. These lesions are usually less than 2mm in diameter and are brown or black in color with smooth margins (Johnson, 2019). The younger leaves show symptoms first, but the disease works its way up the plant. Eventually, the leaves will become so diseased that they will turn yellow and fall off. Pseudopeziza medicaginis will not kill the plant but there will be a reduction in quality and yield (Long, 2017). Leaf spots start to appear 5 – 13 days after inoculation and apothecia are formed 14 days inoculation (Samac, Rhodes, and Lamp, 2015). In the center of the lesion, a dark colored raised disk can be observed and is known as the apothecium. This feature is a diagnostic sign of the disease (UW Extension, 2006). These ascocarps contain the asci which eventually release ascospores to infect more tissues. If the disease progresses enough, elliptical lesions can be observed on the succulent stems. These lesions are not commonly found and do not produce fruiting bodies (UW Extension, 2006).

Environment 
Common leaf spot can be found in any alfalfa field across the United States. While the southwestern states, including Arizona, New Mexico, Utah, and Colorado are only at  moderate risk for this disease, the rest of the U.S. is considered to be under a severe risk (Undersander, 2015). Common leaf spot can be found anywhere that alfalfa is grown, but prefers cool, moist conditions and acidic soils. The ideal temperature for the pathogen is 60-75 degrees Fahrenheit (Long, 2017). The first and second harvests of alfalfa are most threatened. Second harvest tends to be the most affected by the disease because the environmental conditions are just right and the disease has had time to develop. During a rainy season, the dense canopy of alfalfa traps the humidity and makes the perfect environment for the pathogen, giving rise to common leaf spot.

Management 
There has been a significant amount of work done over the years to produce a strain of alfalfa that is resistant to P. medicaginis. However, currently there is no variety that is completely resistant. Planting less susceptible varieties of alfalfa is the best way to combat the issue of common leaf spot (Undersander, 2015). It is important to scout fields early and look for symptoms on the younger leaves of plants. Fungicides can be applied, but are not always successful or cost effective. The severity of the disease is very dependent on the weather and the environment. During cold and wet seasons the fields should be scouted frequently and more carefully. If leaf spot is discovered early in the season, it is possible the symptoms will decrease as the weather warms up. The best thing to do is to harvest early because delayed harvest can make the situation worse. Harvesting early will prevent further defoliation of the current crop, which will preserve some of the quality and yield (UW Extension, 2006). Pseudopeziza medicaginis overwinters in infected plant debris so harvesting early can also reduce the amount of inoculum available for further infections in that growing season and the next year. Harvesting early also allows the field to dry out, and reduces humidity in the phyllosphere making conditions less ideal for the pathogen(Johnson, 2019). Another way to reduce the effects of common leaf spot is proper nutrient management (Grewal, and Williams, 2002). Applications of potassium fertilizer can minimize yield loss, severity, and leaf drop.

References 

 Alfalfa leaf spot (Pseudopeziza medicaginis ). (2010, October 26). Retrieved from https://www.forestryimages.org/browse/detail.cfm?imgnum=1436036.
 https://extension.entm.purdue.edu/newsletters/pestandcrop/article/foliar-diseases-of-alfalfa/
 http://corn.agronomy.wisc.edu/Management/pdfs/IPMManual_2_Alfalfa.pdf
 https://ucanr.edu/blogs/blogcore/postdetail.cfm?postnum=24022
 https://www.agronomy.org/files/publications/alfalfa-management-guide.pdf
 *https://books.google.com/books?hl=en&lr=&id=L_niDCIHF9YC&oi=fnd&pg=PA1&dq=Pseudopeziza+medicaginis+life+cycle&ots=Y04tdywIlo&sig=EgERIGkIYVLQzrD3uCaPHcBAOwQ#v=onepage&q=Pseudopeziza%20medicaginis%20life%20cycle&f=false
Grewal, H. S., & Williams, R. (2002). Influence of potassium fertilization on leaf to stem ratio, nodulation, herbage yield, leaf drop, and common leaf spot disease of alfalfa.
Nutter Jr, F. W., Guan, J., Gotlieb, A. R., Rhodes, L. H., Grau, C. R., & Sulc, R. M. (2002). Quantifying alfalfa yield losses caused by foliar diseases in Iowa, Ohio, Wisconsin, and Vermont. Plant disease, 86(3), 269-277.
Samac, D. A., Rhodes, L. H., & Lamp, W. O. (2015). Compendium of Alfalfa diseases and pests. St. Paul, MN: APS Press.

Fungal plant pathogens and diseases
Dermateaceae